Craig Veasey (born December 25, 1966 in Houston, Texas) is a retired defensive tackle/nose tackle in the NFL. While attending the University of Houston from 1985 to 1989, Craig earned was a 4-year letterman, and a starting 3 of those years. In 1989 as a senior at the University of Houston, he earned the honor of USA Today All-American from the defensive end position for his 17 sacks and 93 tackles. After being selected in the 81 position in the 1990 NFL draft, he played for the Pittsburgh Steelers under Chuck Noll, the Miami Dolphins under Don Shula, and under the Houston Oilers for coaches Jack Pardee and Jeff Fisher. He retired from the Houston Oilers after the 1995 Season

References

1966 births
Living people
American football defensive tackles
Pittsburgh Steelers players
Miami Dolphins players
Houston Oilers players
Houston Cougars football players
Players of American football from Houston
Clear Lake High School (Houston, Texas) alumni